Aldea Asunción is a village and municipality in north-eastern Entre Ríos Province in Argentina.

References

Populated places in Entre Ríos Province